Henry Wardlaw of Torrie was a Scottish landowner and courtier.

He was a son of John Wardlaw of Torrie (died 1558) and Elizabeth Beaton (died 1558), a daughter of John Beaton of Balfour and Mary Boswell. Torrie is in Torryburn parish in Fife.

Elizabeth Beaton, Lady Torrie was a sister of Cardinal David Beaton. In later life John Wardlaw became incapable of managing his affairs. During a court case brought by his younger brother William, witnesses described various details of John Wardlaw's skills and activities as a wealthy laird in Fife.

Henry Wardlaw's daughter Nicholas was a companion of Mary, Queen of Scots. He fought for Mary at the battle of Langside in 1568. He was involved in the death of James Ballany at the battle. Regent Moray declared his property forfeited and gave it to James Cunningham of Drumwuhassill.

Marriages and children
Henry Wardlaw married Alison Hume. His second wife was Katherine Lundy, a daughter of John Lundy of that ilk, a keeper of Stirling Castle

His children included:
 Nicolas Wardlaw, a daughter who was a companion of Mary, Queen of Scots. There were discussions that she might marry David Seton of Parbroath in 1562. She married Patrick Wood of Bonnytoun in Angus. Her daughter Margaret Wood was a lady in waiting of Anne of Denmark. 
 Andrew Wardlaw of Torrie, who married Janet Durie, a daughter of Henry Kemp of Thomastoun and Janet Durie. His father granted him the lands of Torrie on 9 June 1566.
 Robert Wardlaw
 Cuthbert Wardlaw in Balmule, who married Katherine Dalgleish. Their son was Henry Wardlaw of Pitreavie

References

16th-century Scottish people
Court of Mary, Queen of Scots